The 1977–78 season was the 105th season of competitive football in Scotland and the 81st season of Scottish league football. In the Scottish Premier League, the Rangers F.C. were champions. Notable events included the Scotland national football team qualifying for the 1978 FIFA World Cup.

Scottish Premier Division

Champions: Rangers
Relegated: Ayr United, Clydebank

Scottish League First Division

Promoted: Morton, Hearts 
Relegated: Alloa, East Fife

Scottish League Second Division

Promoted: Clyde, Raith Rovers

Cup honours

Other Honours

National

County

 – aggregate over two legs – play off – won on penalties

Highland League

Individual honours

Scottish national team

1978 British Home Championship – Third Place

Key:
(H) = Home match
(A) = Away match
WCQG7 = World Cup qualifying – Group 7
WCG4 = World Cup – Group 4
BHC = British Home Championship

Notes and references

External links
Scottish Football Historical Archive

 
Seasons in Scottish football